Oniongrass or onion grass may refer to:

Wild or feral chives, garlic, or other species in the allium family, particularly Allium vineale, a common lawn weed.
Several species in the genus Melica
Melica bulbosa
The species Romulea rosea